DLASTHR (The Last Hour) is a Assyrian criminal organization that is active in the south western suburbs of Sydney, Australia. The group is said to have originated from another gang, called the Assyrian Kings. The crime gang was formed by Raymon Youmaran who is now serving a 17-year sentence for the murder of Dimitri DeBaz in 2002.
The crime gang has been involved in a number of murders and public shootings, as they established themselves as a major drug dealing and distribution syndicate. Many members sport plenty of ink, including a distinctive clenched fist on their back. NSW police have actively pursued the gang for years, conducting numerous operations that have netted weapons and drugs.

In recent years, gun violence is thought to be part of the gang's turf war over drug supply with its rival gang, The True Kings. The conflict between the two gangs led to a string of drive by shootings and firebombing in the western suburbs of Sydney.

History

Origins

Assyrian organized gangs started appearing in the 1990s with drugs distribution in Sydney's western suburbs. At the time they were known as the Assyrian Kings. In 1997 they were responsible for the killing of police officer David Carty, at the carpark of a Fairfield tavern. Five people were charged for the murder with the main offender receiving a sentence of 30 years.

Sefton Playhouse shooting

The Assyrian Kings fell apart after Carty's murder, but it was revived by Raphael Joseph and Raymon Youmaran and a number of like-minded criminals in 2000s as DLASTHR.
In December 2002 Dimitri Debaz was shot and killed at a strip club in the suburb of Sefton. Raymon Youmaran became the primary suspect for police and disappeared soon after, as well as another suspect Raphael Joseph who went by the nickname of "Hasoni". The NSW Police submission described how Joseph, Youmaran and three other men arrived at the Sefton Hotel where Debaz was celebrating his brother Aleck's birthday with about 15 to 20 friends.

Within a matter of seconds after entering the hotel a fight between Joseph his co-offenders Dimitri and Aleck Debaz had erupted.
Police alleged that the pub's CCTV footage showed Joseph and three accomplices running to their car with Joseph and Youmaran each grabbing a 9mm handgun before fatally shooting Debaz who was standing near the hotel's door. Three shots were fired execution style into the victim's back before the gunmen fled.

Sandro Mirad, the driver of Youmaran and Joseph's get-away car was charged and pleaded guilty to being an accessory after the fact to Debaz's murder. Mirad received a two and a half-year sentence with one and a half-year non-custodial sentence.

Youmaran was wanted by police as he went on hiding. There were a number of retaliation attempts on people associated with Youmaran over a period of several years. While in hiding, Youmaran was involved in drug distribution in South Western suburbs of Sydney, and soon became New South Wales 'most wanted man'.

2005

The Rocks double murder

On 16, April 2005 at approximately 1:10am Naser Ghaderi and Keyvan Ghajaloo were killed in a drive-by shooting on Hickson Road, The Rocks, Sydney. Reports state that as Ghaderi and Ghajaloo were standing by a car, a BMW and a Volkswagen stopped next to them, the driver of the BMW was reported to have said, "Are you the Persians from the party?". Following this conversation a hail of bullets from two guns were fired killing Ghaderi and Ghajaloo. There was a third man from Perth whose identity is not known at this stage (MG). Reports also state this was payback from an altercation Ghaderi had two weeks prior at a Persian event.

During the coroner's inquest into the murders, Ahmed Alfadly, a non-Assyrian associate of the gang, was named as the opponent Ghaderi had during the altercation at the Persian event 2 weeks prior. Raymon Youmaran and Danny Hirmiz were also identified as possible participants in the killings. Alfadly left Australia for Kuwait five days after the shootings and has never returned. To this day no one has been charged for the murders.

Babylon cafe manslaughter

In November 2005 the Babylon Cafe in Fairfield, New South Wales was sprayed with bullets, killing bystander Raymond Khananyah and wounding three others. Three gunmen in balaclavas, armed with semi-automatic pistols, got out of a black car and fired up to 17 shots into the cafe. It was believed the incident was a case of mistaken identity. The car in the shooting was found later and arrests were made but Youmaran still remained at large. In 2011 a coroner's inquest into the Babylon Cafe shooting revealed in the days before the murder there was a previous shooting and a fight where a firearm was produced. Counsel assisting the Coroner Peter McGrath said police believed the shooting was the work of the local Assyrian gang.

McGrath named five men as persons of interest in Khananyah's death including Ramon Youmaran, Steven David, Danny Hurmz, George Hanna, Samer Marcus and Michael Odisho.

2006

Youmaran police escape

On 14 February 2006, Youmaran was spotted by police at a house in Woodcroft, Sydney which police had staked out. Youmaran got into the front passenger seat of a green Mercedes at about 6:15pm. Police tailed the Mercedes at speeds of up to 200 km/h across the M2 and M7 motorways, but the pursuit was called off due to safety concerns.

The following day, a 24-year-old man believed to be involved in the pursuit was arrested and taken to Green Valley Police Station for questioning. Shortly after detectives seized the Mercedes involved in the pursuit from a home in Cecil Hills. They performed forensic tests on the vehicle.

Murder of Audisho

On 9 April 2006, 21-year-old Ashoor Audisho was shot and killed in Hamilton Road, Fairfield West. The murder was linked to Youmaran and his gang. Later that year, three men were arrested and were refused bail.

Linard Shamouil, a founding member of the crime gang, later pleaded guilty to the murder of Audisho. He was sentenced to fourteen years jail. At the time Shamouil was on bail for attempted murder, which he later was found guilty of and was sentenced to a pre-parole period of nine years. He was also sentenced to a five-year, non-parole period for dealing in methamphetamine.

Arrest of Raymon Youmaran

In June 2006, Ramon Youmaran was arrested at Mount Pritchard, following a series of police raids on homes in Sydney's western suburbs. He had been in hiding for four years. Police seized 3000 illegal methamphetamine tablets, with a street value of $1.2 million. Seven other high ranking gang members including Linard Shamouil were also arrested. In 2008 Youmaran pleaded guilty to the murder of Debaz and received a minimum of 17 years in jail.

Raphael Joseph arrest in the United States

Raphael Joseph (also known as Hassoni) was arrested in San Diego in October 2006. Joseph had asked American authorities to deport him back to his country of birth, Iraq. Joseph was extradited from the US in February 2008 after fighting to stay there for more than a year. In March 2008 he faced court in Sydney and was charged with the murder of Dimitri Debaz. However the charges were later dropped after Joseph had been imprisoned for nearly 18 months in the United States of America.

Joseph's disappearance
On 20 March 2014 Rapahel Joseph disappeared after a meeting in Auburn, New South Wales, and was presumed by police to have been abducted and murdered.

Police believe only hours before his abduction, Joseph visited the ex-partner of former Sydney Hells Angel Wayne Schneider, who was abducted and murdered 18 months later.  The two were friends who had risen through gang ranks to become major international criminals, each dealing in millions of dollars of drugs.

On 20 February 2018, Police alleged that Joseph was kidnapped and "inevitably murdered" by a drug syndicate on a rural property in Blaxlands Ridge in Sydney's north-west, police were "rewarded with a series of breakthroughs" after a car with secret compartments was found on a rural property which was linked with Joseph's disappearance. Police said they believed Joseph's remains could also be located on the property where the vehicle was found.

On 11 Jul 2018,the NSW Police announced the reward of $1 million in a bid to encourage people to offer up a "final piece" of information to prosecute those involved in the 2014 murder of Joseph. Police believe people who murdered Joseph were known to them and that he was murdered for financial gain and betrayed by the people he trusted. Police also allege that his body was dumped in a barrel and dissolved in acid.

2013–present

Police raids

On 24, September 2013, more than 300 armed Sydney Police undertook 22 raids that "severely disrupted" the gang. Fifteen suspects were arrested, with four jet skis, a Lotus sports car, replica guns and a boat were confiscated by NSW police for the investigation. A high-ranking member and gang coordinator was arrested at the Rossmore property and charged. The criminals faced 29 charges relating to drug provision and possession and being part of a gang. 8 kg of cannabis was found in one of the raids, plus close to $25,000 in cash.

In 2014 police arrested three remaining gang members and said that it had dismantled the gang's operations and described the gang as finished. Police had seized $20,000 worth of cannabis from the properties raided.

Prison war

During simmering religious tensions in 2015, Adnan "Eddie'’ Darwiche was stabbed multiple times in Goulburn's maximum security jail by members of the Assyrian gang. Its believed that Muslim gang members had been planning to take extremist action against those who oppose their religion. In a pre-emptive strike, the Assyrians struck first, in a daylight attack which happened in front of four prison guards. Darwiche was stabbed eight times by two inmates who used prison knives made from a toilet brush and a sandwich toaster handle. Prison intel said the attack was due to the Muslims versus Christians war that is going on in the prison.

In August 2016, in retaliation to the stabbing of Darwiche, who was moved to Cessnock prison after being attacked, Fadi "Ricky" Shamoun was stabbed by Darwiche and another inmate in his prison cell as payback. Shamoun was stabbed multiple times to his forearms, body and back of the head, with an aluminum window frame sharpened into a knife. Shamoun was not seriously wounded, and was back in jail the same day. Shamoun who has close ties to the Assyrian gang, is serving a minimum 27-year sentence for murder, over a business dispute.

Rival gang

In 2016, conflict between DLASTHR and a young breakaway group known as "True Kings", resulted in Drive by shootings, fire bombings and intimidation, as tensions over drug supply erupted between the two gangs.

On 11, May 2016 police arrested and charged three gang members with shoot with intent to murder, over an incident occurring in Edensor Park.

Police alleged that 3 gang members shot at a car driven by the rival group "True Kings". While the passenger managed to escape, one man was trapped inside the car and was approached by a gang member who allegedly attempted to shoot at him, but the weapon did not fire. Samer Marcus, Danny Hanna, George Hanna, were arrested and appeared before Fairfield Local Court and charged with shooting with intent to murder.

In August 2016, one of the associates of the gang were charged over attempted murder of a 14-year-old at Fairfield railway station. The boy, who survived the attack, was found bleeding with multiple stab wounds. On 17 October 2018, a conviction of wounding with intent to cause grievous bodily harm was announced.

Park shooting & murder of Buxton

On 24 December 2016, 20-year-old Antonio Hermiz, was shot dead at Lizard Log park Wetherill Park. 18-year-old, Ronaldo Odisho, was wounded at the same time. The pair were sitting inside their vehicle at the popular Park, when another car approached. Witnesses saw two groups of males arguing before shots were fired. The two men were both known to police and had ties to the gang.

Earlier that same year, Ex-Nomads bikie gang member Adrian Buxton was shot dead outside his home on 17 May 2016. After the murder of Hermiz, police investigation lead them to believe that DLASTHR group was responsible for the murder of Buxton, but varying theories for the motive are yet to be solidified with evidence.

Police seized a car, a .32 calibre pistol and a 357 Magnum at a house in Cabramatta where two gang members were arrested in September 2016. Police believe both were used to murder Buxton. Ballistic examinations concluded that the weapon was used to murder Buxton.

It's understood that Hermiz was trying to hide an Audi Q7 used in the murder of Adrian Buxton, before he was murdered at the Lizard Log Park, but police are yet to find the car.

Police suggest that Buxton was having an affair with someone linked to a member of DLASTHR, or that a payment was made for a professional hit on Buxton or that he was killed for his links to outlaw motorcycle gang.

Police would not say if Hermiz was directly involved in the murder or what his role was, including disposing of the getaway car.

Cannabis supply arrests

In February 2017, Alina Antal was arrested in Cabramatta and was accused of being involved in cannabis supply in the greater Fairfield area. Antal is alleged to have been recruiting, as well as directing teenage boys. Police allege she was closely associated with Oliver Merza, a member of DLASTHR. Eight people were arrested, one those targeted included the brother of an alleged associate of the gang, who is in jail.

Investigators seized cannabis, cash, mobile phones, SIM cards, clothing and drug paraphernalia in raids of seven homes in Fairfield, Cabramatta West, Smithfield and Elizabeth Hills. Antal and Merza, were both charged with recruiting young teenage boys, and acting with intent to pervert the course of justice.

Gold Coast branch

In March 2017, police discovered that the Assyrian crime gang was operating from Queensland's Gold coast with drug distribution in the area. Police arrested and charged Kris Mircevski, with more than 30 drugs charges. police allege Mircevski was operating in the Gold coast for a number of years, and that many gang members were visiting the Gold Coast on a regular basis. Police also allege that the gang was assisting outlaw motorcycle gangs with the distribution of drugs and weapons.

Samer Marcus life attempts

In June 2020, Samer Marcus, senior DLASTHR member, was shot when a man unleashed a number of shots as one hit Marcus in the face. It was revealed that Marcus had driven to Bonnyrigg Heights to confront a 33-year-old man he had a grievance with. Marcus turned up at hospital with a gunshot wound three days after being hit with the bullet. Adam Saliba was charged with ten offences, including shooting with intent to murder and discharging a firearm. Marcus was also charged with concealing information from police after not reporting that he was shot.

On November 6, 2020, Marcus was gunned down outside his parents' home in Denham Court just before 9pm. He was shot five times in the face and head from close range. He was treated on-site by paramedics before being rushed to hospital in critical condition. After surviving the assassination, Marcus was moved from the hospital he was treated at, for fear that those responsible for the hit would try to finish the job. It was the second Assassination attempt on his life that year, with his injuries so sever Marcus would unlikely fully recover that he would become paralyzed. Police believe the shooting could be linked to tensions between rival gangs in Western Sydney as investigators could not confirm whether the two shootings were linked or whether they are part of a separate affair.

Response
NSW Police Assistant Commissioner Frank Mennilli confessed that getting information from relatives and associates of the gang affiliates is the most vital aspect, stating, "If ever there is to be a message, it is to the family and friends of the people involved in crime. If you want to help ... to do the right thing then – it's about telling the police". The hesitancy to come forward has thwarted recent police efforts to put a stop to the rising gang-related crime in Fairfield in 2016. He described the gang as "a criminal group that have made thousands upon thousands of dollars through their criminal activities" and "have been involved in public place shootings, in murders, and have been a criminal enterprise within the south west of Sydney." He concluded, "The New South Wales police force will not rest until we put each and every one of these criminals behind bars and we smashed this particular operation.

References

External links
Aliraqi.org
Smh.com.au

Assyrian Australian
Assyrian gangs
Organised crime in Sydney
Gangs in Australia
Street gangs
1997 establishments in Australia
Organizations established in 1997